The Nanpu Bridge, in Shanghai, China, sister bridge to the Yangpu Bridge, is one of the main bridges in Shanghai.

The cable-stayed bridge was designed by the Shanghai Municipal Engineering Design Institute, Shanghai Urban Construction College, and Shanghai Urban Construction Design Institute, with assistance from Holger S. Svensson. It has a main span of 428 meters (1,388 ft), shorter than its sister bridge. It is the 57th longest cable-stayed bridge in the world, opened to the public in 1991.

External links

 

1991 establishments in China
Bridges completed in 1991
Bridges in Shanghai
Cable-stayed bridges in China
Transport in Shanghai